Prince Dominik Mikołaj Radziwiłł (1643–1697) was a Polish–Lithuanian noble (szlachcic) and politician.

He was son of Court and Grand Marshal Aleksander Ludwik Radziwiłł and Princess Lucricia Marie Strozzi. He married Anna Marianna Połubienska on 11 October 1660, and in 1692 the daughter of Grand Marshal and Hetman Jerzy Sebastian Lubomirski, Anna Krystyna Lubomirska.

He was Ordynat of Kleck, Deputy Chancellor of Lithuania since 1681 and Grand Chancellor of Lithuania since 1690. He was also Starost of Lida, Radom, Pińsk, Tuchola and Gniew.

Through his son Jan, he was the great-grandfather of Michał Hieronim Radziwiłł.

Secular senators of the Polish–Lithuanian Commonwealth
1643 births
1697 deaths
Dominik Mikolaj
Grand Chancellors of the Grand Duchy of Lithuania
Deputy Chancellors of the Grand Duchy of Lithuania